Judy Blunt (born 1954) is an American writer from Montana.  Her most notable work to date is Breaking Clean, a collection of linked essays exploring her rural upbringing.

Biography
Blunt was raised on a cattle ranch in a remote area of Phillips County, Montana, near Regina, south of Malta, Montana.  In 1986 she moved with her three small children to Missoula to attend the University of Montana.

She later turned the tales of her ranch life into her memoir, Breaking Clean (Knopf 2002), which won a Whiting Award, the PEN/Jerard Fund Award, Mountains and Plains Nonfiction Book Award, and Willa Cather Literary Award, and was one of The New York Times' Notable Books. She received a Jacob K. Javits Graduate Fellowship and a Montana Arts Council Individual Artist Fellowship. Her essays and poems have appeared in such publications as The New York Times, Big Sky Journal and Oprah Magazine.

Blunt received her M.F.A. from the University of Montana in 1994.  She currently resides in Missoula, where she is an associate professor at the University of Montana.

Bibliography
Breaking Clean, Knopf: 2002 (hardcover),

References

External links
Powells.com interview
Random House author bio
January Magazine review of Breaking Clean
Excerpt from Breaking Clean
U of M bio/press release
A Conversation with Judy Blunt, author of Breaking Clean
Profile at The Whiting Foundation

1954 births
Living people
Writers from Missoula, Montana
University of Montana alumni
American memoirists
Pacific University faculty
University of Montana faculty
People from Phillips County, Montana
American women memoirists
American women academics
21st-century American women